The Badminton Federation of Nigeria is the national governing body that oversees and manages affairs related to the sport of badminton in Nigeria. The federation was formed in 1998. The body is affiliated to the Badminton Confederation of Africa It controls all badminton related activities across Nigeria.

References

External links
 Official website
 Official facebook

Nigeria
Sports governing bodies in Nigeria
Badminton in Nigeria
2003 establishments in Nigeria